"Closing Time" is the third single from the album Fellow Hoodlums by Scottish rock band Deacon Blue. Released on 30 September 1991, it peaked at  42 on the UK Singles Chart.

Two of the three B-sides, "I Was Like That" and "Friends of Billy Bear", continue the style of "Fourteen Years" and "Faifley" on the "Your Swaying Arms" single, utilising raw music and low, gruff, and rambling spoken and sung vocals from Ricky Ross. The third B-side, "Into the Good Night", is a more traditional Deacon Blue song.

Track listings
All songs were written by Ricky Ross except where noted.

7-inch and cassette single (657502 7; 657502 4)
 "Closing Time" (7-inch version) – 4:19
 "I Was Like That" (Ross, James Prime) – 4:30

12-inch single (657502 6)
 "Closing Time" (extended version) – 6:25
 "Friends of Billy Bear" – 2:32
 "I Was Like That" (Ross, Prime) – 4:30
 "Into the Good Night" – 3:40

CD single (657502 2)
 "Closing Time" (7-inch version) – 4:19
 "I Was Like That" (Ross, Prime) – 4:30
 "Into the Good Night" – 3:40

References

Deacon Blue songs
1991 singles
1991 songs
Columbia Records singles
Songs written by Ricky Ross (musician)